Listrophorus is a genus of parasitic mites in the family Listrophoridae. North American species with their hosts include:
Listrophorus americanus – muskrat (Ondatra zibethicus)
Listrophorus caudatus – round-tailed muskrat (Neofiber alleni)
Listrophorus dicrostonyx – collared lemming (Dicrostonyx)
Listrophorus dozieri – muskrat; Virginia opossum (Didelphis virginiana)
Listrophorus faini – muskrat
Listrophorus floridanus – southeastern pocket gopher (Geomys pinetis)
Listrophorus kingstownensis – muskrat
Listrophorus klebergi – hispid pocket mouse (Chaetodipus hispidus); hispid cotton rat (Sigmodon hispidus)
Listrophorus laynei – round-tailed muskrat
Listrophorus leuckarti – meadow vole (Microtus pennsylvanicus); house mouse (Mus musculus)
Listrophorus mexicanus – sagebrush vole (Lemmiscus curtatus); rock vole (Microtus chrotorrhinus); montane vole (Microtus montanus); prairie vole (Microtus ochrogaster); creeping vole (Microtus oregoni); meadow vole; water vole (Microtus richardsoni); Townsend's vole (Microtus townsendii); western red-backed vole (Myodes californicus); southern red-backed vole (Myodes gapperi); southern bog lemming (Synaptomys cooperi); white-footed mouse (Peromyscus leucopus); house mouse; woodland jumping mouse (Napaeozapus insignis); meadow jumping mouse (Zapus hudsonius); western jumping mouse (Zapus princeps); least weasel (Mustela nivalis); pallid bat (Antrozous pallidus); Townsend's mole (Scapanus townsendii); marsh shrew (Sorex bendirii); long-tailed shrew (Sorex dispar)
Listrophorus neotomae – Florida woodrat (Neotoma floridana); southern Plains woodrat (Neotoma micropus)
Listrophorus ondatrae – muskrat
Listrophorus phenacomys – eastern heather vole (Phenacomys ungava)
Listrophorus pitymys – northern short-tailed shrew (Blarina brevicauda); meadow vole; pine vole (Microtus pinetorum)
Listrophorus sparsilineatus – cotton mouse (Peromyscus gossypinus)
Listrophorus synaptomys – northern bog lemming (Synaptomys borealis); southern bog lemming
Listrophorus validus – muskrat

An unidentified species has been recorded on the marsh rice rat (Oryzomys palustris) in Georgia.

See also
List of parasites of the marsh rice rat

References

Literature cited
Morlan, H.B. 1952. Host relationships and seasonal abundance of some Southwest Georgia ectoparasites (subscription required). American Midland Naturalist 48(1):74–93.
Whitaker, J.O. and Wilson, N. 1974. Host and distribution lists of mites (Acari), parasitic and phoretic, in the hair of wild mammals of North America, north of Mexico (subscription required). American Midland Naturalist 91(1):1–67.
Whitaker, J.O., Walters, B.L., Castor, L.K., Ritzi, C.M. and Wilson, N. 2007. Host and distribution lists of mites (Acari), parasitic and phoretic, in the hair or on the skin of North American wild mammals north of Mexico: records since 1974. Faculty Publications from the Harold W. Manter Laboratory of Parasitology, University of Nebraska, Lincoln 1:1–173.

Sarcoptiformes
Arachnids of North America
Parasites of rodents